Center Township is one of fifteen townships in Wayne County, Indiana, United States. As of the 2010 census, its population was 7,579 and it contained 3,204 housing units.

History
Center Township was organized in 1817.

The Lewis Jones House, King-Dennis Farm, and Samuel G. Smith Farm are listed on the National Register of Historic Places.

Geography
The streams of Black Run, Bryant Creek, Center Run, Centrum Run, Cold Run, Cool Brook, Crown Creek, Far Run, Fork Creek, Free Run, Middle Run, Point Run, Rich Creek, Sleet Brook, Snow Run Brook and Winter Run run through this township.

Cities and towns
 Richmond (west edge)
 Centerville

Unincorporated towns
 Pinhook at 
 West Grove at 
(This list is based on USGS data and may include former settlements.)

Adjacent townships
 Green Township (north)
 Webster Township (northeast)
 Wayne Township (east)
 Boston Township (southeast)
 Abington Township (south)
 Washington Township (southwest)
 Harrison Township (west)
 Jackson Township (west)
 Clay Township (northwest)

Cemeteries
The township contains three cemeteries: Crown Hill, Crown Hill and West Grove.

Major highways
 Interstate 70
 U.S. Route 40
 State Road 38

Education
Center Township is served by the Centerville-Center Township Public Library.

References
 
 United States Census Bureau cartographic boundary files

External links
 Indiana Township Association
 United Township Association of Indiana

Townships in Wayne County, Indiana
Townships in Indiana